The Nouvelle Alliance Québec-Canada (English: New Quebec-Canada Alliance) was a political party in Quebec. It was founded in 2009 as the "Parti de la réforme financière", and changed its name in 2010. Its main aim was for the provincial government to make more sensible choices in the way it spends the people's money. According to QuebecPolitique.com, the party also advocated "the recovery of the financial situation of Quebec by the repatriation of all taxing powers from Ottawa to Quebec." The chief electoral officer withdrew the party's authorization on December 9, 2011. The party later moved its website back to www.reformefinanciere.com.

Platform
The Government of Quebec collecting and administer all public monies 
Requesting more in equalization payments

Electoral history
In the 2009 by-election in Rivière-du-Loup, leader Denis Couture ran under the Parti de la réforme financière banner, coming in 7th out of 8 candidates with 40 votes (0.19%).

References

External links
Official website 

Provincial political parties in Quebec